Brahmadesam  is an Indian Panchayat village located in Veppanthattai taluk of Perambalur district in the state of Tamil Nadu. According to the 2001 census, the village had a population of 2390, with a literacy rate of 66.32%.

References

Villages in Perambalur district